Tangla is a genus of moths of the family Crambidae. The genus was erected by Charles Swinhoe in 1900.

Species
Tangla polyzonalis (Hampson, 1898)
Tangla sectinotalis (Hampson, 1898)
Tangla zangisalis (Walker, 1859)

References

Pyraustinae
Crambidae genera
Taxa named by Charles Swinhoe